Highway 5 is an Iraqi highway which extends from Baqubah to the Khosravi border crossing and to Qasr-e Shirin in Iran.  It passes through Muqdadiyah, As Sa'Diyah and Khanaqin.

Roads in Iraq